In urban planning, brownfield land is land previously used for industrial purposes or some commercial uses.

Brownfield or Brown Field may also refer to:

Places
Brownfield, Maine
Brownfield, Missouri
Brownfield, Texas
Brownfield Independent School District
Brownfields, Louisiana
Brownfield, Alberta, a hamlet in Alberta, Canada
Brown Field, a camp at Marine Corps Base Quantico

People with the surname
Troy Brownfield
William Brownfield

Other uses
Brownfield status, a legal condition regarding certain land
Brownfield (software development)
Brown Field Municipal Airport, San Diego County, California
Brown Field (Tulane University), sports field in New Orleans, Louisiana, USA
Brown Field (Valparaiso University), stadium in Valparaiso, Indiana, USA

See also
Brown (disambiguation)
Field (disambiguation)